Anna Vogelzang (born 26 February 1985) is an American singer-songwriter from Lexington, Massachusetts. Now living in Los Angeles, she composes and performs on guitar, ukulele, baritone ukulele, banjo, and kalimba. She released Beacon, co-produced by Tyler Chester, on 4 October 2019, and has been touring the United States since 2007.

Career 
In 2005, Vogelzang recorded her first studio album, Some Kind of Parade, at the Carnegie Mellon School of Music. Her second album, "The Things That Airplanes Do", followed in 2007 and served as her senior thesis at the school. After graduation she continued making albums, began touring, and eventually gained accolades at songwriting competitions, including the Falcon Ridge Folk Festival Emerging Artist Showcase, Telluride Troubadour Contest, Rocky Mountain Folks Festival Songwriter Showcase, and the National Women's Music Festival "Got Talent" Competition.

In 2014, Vogelzang appeared on Wisconsin Public Television's 30-Minute Music Hour and Wisconsin Public Radio's Simply Folk programs. Her work in the Madison, WI community included teaching at Girls Rock Camp Madison and founding the Wintersong Madison event, a holiday revue which raised over $10,000 for Second Harvest Foodbank of Southern Wisconsin in 2014. In 2015, Vogelzang recorded Hiker with producer Todd Sickafoose.

In 2016, Vogelzang moved from Madison, Wisconsin to Los Angeles, California. She is on the songwriting faculty at the Los Angeles College of Music. In 2017 Vogelzang and Adam Levy co-founded the NELA Song Salon, a songwriting workshop for fellow local musicians that later became a residency at the Bootleg Theater. Vogelzang recorded Beacon from 2017-2018 with co-producer Tyler Chester and musicians Adam Levy and Jay Bellerose, which later released in 2019.  

Vogelzang has opened for Sara Bareilles, Gillian Welch, Mirah, Laura Gibson, Simone Felice, Anais Mitchell, Wye Oak, and has shared the stage multiple times with Madison Cunningham, Watkins Family Hour,  Amanda Palmer, Pearl and the Beard, Franz Nicolay, Emilyn Brodsky. and PHOX.

Her full bio is available on her website  https://www.theanna.com/bio-full

Discography
 Beacon (2019)
 Hiker (2016)
 Driftless EP (2014)
 Canary in a Coal Mine (2012)
 Secret Cedar Room EP (2010)
 Paper Boats (2010)
 Marry Me 7" (2009)
 Nesting EP (2009)
 The Things That Airplanes Do (2007)
 Some Kind of Parade (2005)
 Sounds Live EP (2005)
 Basics Live Album (2004)

Accolades 
 2014 Wisconsin Area Music Industry Awards Nominee: Singer/Songwriter of the Year
 2013 Madison Area Music Awards: Unique Performer of the Year
 2012 Rocky Mountain Folks Festival: Songwriter Showcase Performer
 2012 International Acoustic Music Awards Finalist
 2012 Telluride Troubadour Contest Alternate
 2011 Madison Area Music Awards: Unique Album of the Year & Cover Song of the Year
 2010 National Women's Music Festival Talent Competition Winner, 2011 Mainstage
 2010 Falcon Ridge Folk Festival Emerging Artist

External links
Anna Vogelzang's Official Website

References

Living people
1985 births
Musicians from Madison, Wisconsin
People from Winchester, Massachusetts
Singer-songwriters from Massachusetts
American women singer-songwriters
21st-century American singers
21st-century American women singers
Singer-songwriters from Wisconsin